Helvetia Berlin was a German association football club from the city of Berlin.

The short-lived club was established 5 June 1898 and disappeared sometime in 1906. Helvetia took part in the top-flight Oberliga Berlin in the 1901–02 season where they finished 5th in the six team Staffel B.

BTuFC also fielded a cricket team. Thorball or torball was a German word in use in the 1890s and early 1900s for the sport of cricket. Several early clubs playing the new "English" games of football, rugby, and cricket incorporated it into their name. The term never caught on and did not enter into common usage, soon being abandoned by sports clubs.

References

Football clubs in Germany
Defunct football clubs in Germany
Defunct football clubs in Berlin
1898 establishments in Germany
1906 disestablishments in Germany
Association football clubs established in 1898
Association football clubs disestablished in 1906